KRKX (94.1 FM) is a commercial radio station in Billings, Montana.  KRKX airs a country music format.

Ownership
In June 2006, KRKX was acquired by Cherry Creek Radio from Fisher Radio Regional Group as part of a 24 station deal with a total reported sale price of $33.3 million. Recently KRKX switched its local morning show to a nationally satellite delivered show titled " Tony and Kris in the morning" replacing D.J. Captain Mike's morning show.

On January 1, 2010, KRKX changed their format to country, branded as "K-Sky".

On May 7, 2019, Connoisseur Media announced that it would sell its Billings cluster to Desert Mountain Broadcasting, an entity formed by Connoisseur Billings general manager Cam Maxwell. The sale closed on July 31, 2019.

References

http://jerodschaefer.com/?P=187

External links

RKX
Radio stations established in 1989
1989 establishments in Montana